Marcellus Coffermans (1520 – 1578), was a Flemish renaissance painter.

Biography
He was born in Helmond and is known for religious works and copies after other painters. He taught his daughter Isabella, who also became a painter.

He died in Antwerp.

References

Marcellus Coffermans on Artnet

1520 births
1578 deaths
Early Netherlandish painters
Artists from Antwerp